Glimcher is a surname. Notable people with the surname include:

 Arne Glimcher (born 1938), American art dealer, film producer and director
 Laurie Glimcher, member of the National Academy of Sciences
 Paul Glimcher (born 1961), American economist, psychologist and neuroscientist
 Marc Glimcher (born 1963), American art dealer

See also
 Glimcher Realty Trust was a Columbus, Ohio-based real estate investment trust founded by Herbert Glimcher